McCullin is a surname and may refer to:
 Don McCullin, a British photojournalist
 McCullin (film), a 2012 British documentary film about Don McCullin